Woodall services is a motorway service station on the M1 motorway in Rotherham close to Sheffield in England. It lies between junctions 30 and 31. It was opened in 1968 by Trust House Forte but was renamed Welcome Break after the takeover of the company. It takes its name from the nearby village of Woodall.

Facilities
Woodall was also one of the few service stations to have a Burger King, KFC and a McDonald's. The Northbound side had a McDonald's (open 24 hours), which closed in March 2020, and has a KFC, with the Southbound side having a Burger King and a KFC. Both sides of the service station are linked by footbridge. The services are very close to the Derbyshire border but it actually lies in the Metropolitan Borough of Rotherham. Woodall was one of two Welcome Break services which had a McDonald's; the other one was Fleet on the M3 in Hampshire 

The service station has 233 employees as of November 2019.

This service area has proven to be very popular with coaches heading North and South because of the coach hosts there.

Layout
The MSA is accessible from  both the Northbound and Southbound carriageways.

The MSA has murals by David Fisher in the 1990s, designed to reflect the local area and history.

References

External links

Motorway Services Online - Woodall
J31 - Woodall Services

M1 motorway service stations
Welcome Break motorway service stations
Transport in South Yorkshire
Metropolitan Borough of Rotherham